Janette Louise Buckbee ( Ahrens, December 10, 1925 – April 24, 2016), also known as Deedee Ahrens, was an American figure skater.

Life and career
Ahrens was born in Saint Paul, Minnesota on December 10, 1925. She attended the University of Minnesota during the 1940s. Ahrens competed as both a single and pair skater, first with partner Robert Uppgren and later with Arthur Preusch. She also competed in fours with Uppgren, Mary Louise Premer, and Lyman Wakefield Jr. and won the 1941 North American title. Ahrens married Norman Simmons DeCoster in 1947, before divorcing and remarrying to Allen Buckbee in December 1985. During the 1970s, Ahrens lived in Minneapolis, Minnesota, but later resided in White Bear Lake. She died in Mahtomedi, Minnesota on April 24, 2016, at the age of 90.

Competitive highlights

Ladies' singles

Pair skating
(with Uppgren) 

(with Preusch)

Four skating
(with Premer, Uppgren, and Wakefield)

References

1925 births
2016 deaths
20th-century American women
American female pair skaters
American female single skaters